The 1979 Giro di Lombardia was the 73rd edition of the Giro di Lombardia cycle race and was held on 13 October 1979. The race started in Milan and finished in Como. The race was won by Bernard Hinault of the Renault team.

General classification

References

1979
Giro di Lombardia
Giro di Lombardia
Giro di Lombardia
1979 Super Prestige Pernod